The Women's Party (KP) is a feminist political party in Turkey, which advocates social egalitarianism between genders.

The Women's Party was founded on 26 June 2014 and led by Fatma Benal Yazgan and Fatma Aytaç.

See also
 List of political parties in Turkey

References

External links
 

2014 establishments in Turkey
Feminist parties in Europe
Left-wing politics in Turkey
Political parties established in 2014
Political parties in Turkey
Feminist parties in Turkey